Namayingo is a town in Namayingo District in the Eastern Region of Uganda. It is the site of the district headquarters.

Location

The coordinates of Namayingo are 0°20'42.0"N, 33°52'48.0"E (Latitude:0.3450; Longitude:33.8800).

Overview
The town of Namayingo is small and dusty and lacks public running water, electricity, or a sewer system. The public roads are notoriously bad, prompting a public demonstration numbering about 200 people in January 2013.

In 2020, the Musita–Lumino–Busia Road, which passes through town and has been under improvement to class II bitumen standard since 2015, was commissioned in November 2020, upon completion of those renovations. The renovated road has led to faster travel times and improved the ease of doing business in Namayingo Town, Namayingo District and surrounding communities.

Population
In September 2002, the population census put the population of Namayingo at 8,332. In August 2014, the national population census put the population at 15,741.

In 2015 the Uganda Bureau of Statistics (UBOS) estimated the population of the town at 15,900. In 2020, the population agency estimated the population of Namayingo Town at 17,300 people. Of these, 9,100 (52.6 percent) were female and 8,200 (47.4 percent) were male. UBOS calculated the annual growth rate of the town's population to average 1.70 percent, between 2015 and 2020.

Points of interest
The following additional points of interest lie within the town limits or near its borders:

1. The offices of Namayingo Town Council

2. The offices of Namayingo District Local Government

3. Namayingo Central Market

4. Buyinja Health Centre IV, a government healthcare facility owned by the Uganda Ministry of Health, administered by the Namayingo District Administration.

5. Musita–Mayuge–Lumino–Majanji–Busia Road, passing through town in a general west to east direction.

6.

References

External links
Hashaka To Reinvent Namayingo District
UNRA Paves 1200Km Roads; 5,000Km for Tarmacking By 2016

Populated places in Eastern Region, Uganda
Cities in the Great Rift Valley
Namayingo District
Busoga